Helen Richards-Nethercutt (born September 12, 1952) is an American businesswoman and autism awareness activist.

Career 
Helen Wilkins was born in 1952 in Buckingham, Illinois and graduated from Herscher High School in 1969. She married U.S. Army specialist John Richards and adopted the name Helen Richards. They had two children, Travis and an autistic son Trent. 

In 1980 she had a divorce and moved to Las Vegas, where she worked at a grocery store and would meet Jack Nethercutt II whom she later married. The couple operated a luxury restaurant named Boison's near the Las Vegas Strip, which won a LVRJ Best of Las Vegas award. In 2004 they were passed down Merle Norman Cosmetics and the Nethercutt Collection from Jack's father, J.B. Nethercutt.

She became a financial contributor for the USC Trojans athletic program and donated for the Galen Center, Merle Norman Stadium, Uytengsu Aquatics Center, and the Spirit of Troy marching band.

Autism charity 
She has donated to several autism schools and charities within California, Nevada, and Illinois. She became a major financial contributor to the Exceptional Children's Foundation (ECF) based in Culver City, California.

References

External links 

 https://uscwot.exposure.co/helen-nethercutt

Autism activists
Nethercutt-Richards family
American women in business
Living people
1952 births
21st-century American women
Racing drivers' wives and girlfriends